The Australian Film Institute Global Achievement Award was a special award presented by the Australian Film Institute (AFI) to "recognise outstanding achievement by Australians working internationally", to an individual who has "demonstrated outstanding excellence in their field and shows a continuing commitment to the Australian film and television industry." It was handed out at the Australian Film Institute Awards (known commonly as the AFI Awards), which are now the AACTA Awards after the establishment of the Australian Academy of Cinema and Television Arts (AACTA), by the AFI. The award was presented from 2001-2004 before it was split into two categories for International Best Actor and International Best Actress, but it was handed out again in 2007.

Winners

See also
Australian Film Institute International Award for Best Actor 
Australian Film Institute International Award for Best Actress
AACTA Awards

References

External links
The Australian Academy of Cinema and Television Arts Official website

Awards established in 2001
G